Ben James Peters (born Greenville, Mississippi, June 20, 1933; died Nashville, Tennessee, May 25, 2005) was an American country music songwriter who wrote many #1 songs. Charley Pride recorded 68 of his songs and 6 of them went to #1 on the American country charts. Peters was inducted into the Nashville Songwriters Hall of Fame in 1980.

Peters was briefly a recording artist himself; his only charting hit was his own composition "San Francisco is a Lonely Town", which hit #46 on the country charts in 1969.

Number One Compositions in America

"Turn the World Around" (1967) was a #1 Billboard chart country hit for Eddy Arnold & top 5 Billboard chart AC single.
"That's A No, No" was a 1969 #1 Cashbox chart country hit for  Lynn Anderson.
"Kiss an Angel Good Mornin'" was a 1971 #1 Billboard chart country hit for Charley Pride; it also went to #21 on the American pop charts. It won Ben Peters the 1973 Grammy Award for Best Country Song.
"It's Gonna Take a Little Bit Longer" was a 1972 #1 Billboard chart country hit for Charley Pride.
"Before the Next Teardrop Falls" (w/Vivian Keith); first recorded in 1967 by Duane Dee in a version which reached #44 on the Billboard country singles chart early in 1968, the 1975 version by Freddy Fender was a #1 Billboard chart country and a #1 Billboard chart pop hit; it won a Country Music Association Award for Single of the Year in 1975.
"Love Put a Song in My Heart" (1975) was a #1 Billboard chart country hit for Johnny Rodriguez.
"A Whole Lotta Things to Sing About" was a #1 Billboard chart country hit for Charley Pride in 1976.
"Daytime Friends" (1977) was a #1 Billboard chart country hit for Kenny Rogers. Westlife covered this song for a special BBC performance with Tony Brown as producer.
"Burgers and Fries" was a 1978 #1 Billboard chart country hit for Charley Pride.
"Before My Time" was a 1979 #1 Record World chart country hit for John Conlee and also a #1 hit on Canada's RPM'S country chart.
"You're So Good When You're Bad" (1982) was a #1 Billboard chart country hit for  Charley Pride.

Other Number One Compositions
 I Want To Wake Up With You as recorded by Reggae singer, Boris Gardiner (1986-1987). This song was #1 in UK for 3 weeks. This song is one of the biggest hits in the history of reggae music.
"Living It Down" went #1 in Canada's country music charts and it went to #2 as a Billboard chart country hit for Freddy Fender in 1976 in America.

Notable Compositions

"If The Whole World Stopped Lovin'" was a #3 pop hit in the UK in November 1967 for the Irish singer Val Doonican. It made #2 in Ireland.
"If The Whole World Stopped Lovin'" was a #12 American Billboard chart hit in 1966 pop hit for Roy Drusky.
"Misty Memories" was a Grammy Nominated country chart hit for Brenda Lee in 1971.
"I Need Somebody Bad" was a #11 Billboard country chart hit for Jack Greene in 1973.
"Don't Give Up On Me" was a #3 American Billboard country chart hit for Jerry Wallace in 1973.
"It's Time To Cross That Bridge" was a #13 Billboard chart country hit for Jack Greene in 1973.
"I Can't Believe That It's All Over" was a #13 Billboard chart country hit for Skeeter Davis in 1973.
"All Over Me" was a 1975 #4 Billboard chart country hit in America for Charlie Rich.
"Lovin' On" was a #20 American Billboard chart country hit for T.G. Sheppard in 1977.
"Before the Night is Over" was recorded by Jerry Lee Lewis originally in 1977 and by Jerry Lee and BB King in 2006.
"Puttin' In Overtime At Home" was a 1977 #8 Billboard chart country hit in America for Charlie Rich. It made #3 in Canada.
"Lovin' On" was a #16 American Billboard chart country hit for Bellamy Brothers in 1978.
"Tell Me What It's Like" (1979) was a #8 American Billboard chart Grammy Nominated country hit for Brenda Lee.
"Lost My Baby Blues" was a 1982 top 5 Billboard chart country hit in America for David Frizzell. It made #5 in Canada.
"I'm Only a Woman" recorded by Tammy Wynette.
"San Francisco is a Lonely Town" was recorded and released in 1976 by Glen Campbell.

Notable History Making Albums

Peters had 3 songs, "The Little Town Square", "That's A No No" and "Satan Place" on the million selling The Harper Valley P.T.A. album. This is a pop culture music album by Jeannie C. Riley released in 1968. This is Jeannie C. Riley's biggest album ever. The album was released by Plantation Records, and was very successful. The album reached No. 1 on the Billboard pop album chart, and No. 1 on the Billboard country album chart.
Peters had 2 songs, "Mr. Mistletoe" and "Soon It Will Be Christmas Day" on The Christmas Album. This is a holiday music album by country music singer Lynn Anderson released in 1971. This was Lynn Anderson's first Christmas music album. The album was released by Columbia Records, and was very successful. The album reached No. 13 on the "Billboard 200" in 1971 (her highest chart position on that chart).
Peters had 1 song, "Daytime Friends" on the 4 million selling 10 Years of Gold album. This is a collection of 10 years of Kenny Rogers hits.  The album was released by United Artist, and went No. 1 on the Billboard country album chart in 1977.
Peters had 1 song, "Daytime Friends" on the 4 million selling Kenny Rogers 20 Greatest Hits album. This is a collection of his hits prior to this project released in 1983. The album was released by Liberty Records, and was successful.

References

American country songwriters
American male songwriters
University of Southern Mississippi alumni
2005 deaths
1933 births
Musicians from Greenville, Mississippi
20th-century American musicians
Songwriters from Mississippi
20th-century American male musicians